John DeStefani Hartigan (February 28, 1940 – June 1, 2020) was an American coxswain who twice competed at Olympic Games.

Hartigan was born in 1940 in Minneapolis, Minnesota, United States. He was a coxswain for the University of Pennsylvania, and he graduated from there in 1963. At the 1968 Summer Olympics, he coxed the men's four and they came fifth. He won a gold medal at the 1974 World Rowing Championships in Lucerne with the lightweight men's eight. At the 1979 Pan American Games in San Juan, Puerto Rico, he won a bronze medal with the coxed four. At the 1983 Pan American Games in Caracas, Venezuela, he won gold with the coxed four. He last competed at international level with the lightweight men's eight at the 1986 World Rowing Championships in Nottingham, England, where they came sixth.

References

1940 births
2020 deaths
American male rowers
World Rowing Championships medalists for the United States
Coxswains (rowing)
Rowers at the 1968 Summer Olympics
Olympic rowers of the United States
Rowers at the 1976 Summer Olympics
Pan American Games medalists in rowing
Pan American Games gold medalists for the United States
Penn Quakers rowers
Rowers at the 1979 Pan American Games
Rowers at the 1983 Pan American Games
Medalists at the 1979 Pan American Games
Medalists at the 1983 Pan American Games